On Moral Fiction is a collection of essays by the American novelist John Gardner published in 1978.

In this work, Gardner attacks what he sees as contemporary literature's lack of morality, which he calls the highest purpose of art and which he defines in the book.  According to Gardner, morality is not an arbitrary social construct, but an eternal truth, taking on different forms but not essentially changing through the ages.  He says that moral fiction "attempts to test human values, not for the purpose of preaching or peddling a particular ideology, but in a truly honest and open-minded effort to find out which best promotes human fulfillment."

Leo Tolstoy, among others, espouses similar views in his essay What is Art?, and Gardner draws upon Tolstoy in his argument.

See also
 Moral realism

Bibliography

1978 essays
American non-fiction books
Essays by John Gardner (American writer)
Essays in literary criticism
Ethics literature
Works about postmodernism